Tappeh Kabud-e Sofla Abdol Mohammad (also Romanized as Tappeh Kabūd-e Soflá ʿAbdol Moḩammad) is a village in Ozgoleh Rural District, Ozgoleh District, Salas-e Babajani County, Kermanshah Province, Iran. At the 2006 census, its population was 155, in 29 families.

References 

Populated places in Salas-e Babajani County